Thomas Brackett Reed Jr. (October 18, 1839 – December 7, 1902) was an American attorney and Republican Party politician from Maine who served as the 32nd Speaker of the United States House of Representatives for three nonconsecutive terms from 1889 to 1891 and 1895 to 1899. His first term was marked by a dramatic expansion of the Speaker's formal authority through changes to the House Rules, and he remains one of the most powerful Speakers in House history.

Prior to his service in Congress, Reed was represented Portland in the Maine House of Representatives and Senate and served as Attorney General of Maine. In 1876, he was elected to represent  Cumberland and York counties in the U.S. House and was re-elected for twelve consecutive terms. 

As Speaker, Reed had greater influence over the agenda and operations of the House than any prior Speaker. He increased the Speaker's power limiting the ability of the minority party to prevent the establishment of a quorum. Reed helped pass the Lodge Bill, which sought to protect African American voting rights in the Southern United States, but the bill failed in the Senate and never became law.

In 1896, he ran for President but lost the Republican nomination to William McKinley. While serving as Speaker in 1899, Reed resigned from the House in protest against the Spanish-American War.

Early life and education
Thomas Brackett Reed was born on October 18, 1839 in a small two-story tenement on Hancock Street in Portland, Maine. His parents, Matilda Prince (née Mitchell) and Thomas Brackett Reed Sr., were natives of Maine who traced their American ancestry to the Arbella and Mayflower, respectively. The Reed family were not wealthy; Thomas Sr. was captain of a fishing boat before becoming a watchman in a Portland sugar warehouse.

Reed attended public schools, including the Portland Boys' School, and was an avid student and reader. He showed interest in public affairs from an early age, attending Neal Dow's trial for involvement in the Portland Rum Riot in 1855. He was also an avid member of the Congregational Church as a young man. Members of his congregation raised funds to provide him a college education with intent that he become a minister, but he left the church and returned the donations.

Bowdoin College (1856–60)
After graduating high school, Reed entered Bowdoin College in 1856 and undertook a mandatory course centered on Christian theology, Latin, Greek, and mathematics. Bowdoin was noted for its required courses in English composition and oratory and had already produced Nathaniel Hawthorne, President of the United States Franklin Pierce, and Henry Wadsworth Longfellow. The faculty consisted of ten men, led by president Leonard Woods and including Charles Carroll Everett, Thomas C. Upham, Alpheus Packard, and William Smyth. Reed's professor of rhetoric and oratory, Joshua Chamberlain, later distinguished himself at the Battle of Gettysburg and served as Governor of Maine during Reed's term in the state legislature.

At Bowdoin, Reed gained a personal reputation for his ability to recite Joseph Butler's Analogy of Religion, Natural and Revealed from memory. He was a member of the rowing crew, chess club, Psi Upsilon fraternity, and an editor of the annual yearbook. He debated as a member of the Peucinian Society and was an avid reader of Carlyle, Goethe, Thackeray, Macaulay, and Charles Reade, among other less popular authors. 

Reed kept a small, close group of friends, including Samuel Fessenden, the son of U.S. Senator William Pitt Fessenden, who provided Reed a loan to complete his education. Samuel Fessenden was an avid abolitionist who participate in the civil conflict in Kansas and, one year after graduation, died at the Second Battle of Bull Run. His death had a profound impact on Reed, who memorialized Fessenden as "the quiet associate of the studious hours ... sublimated in the crucible of death from all imperfections, clothed upon with all his virtues and radiant with all the possibilities and radiant with all the possibilities of a generous youth."

Legal and U.S. Navy career (1860–65)
As a senior, Reed reversed a previously mediocre academic record to lead his class; he finished fifth in the graduating class of 1860 and was elected to Phi Beta Kappa. Abandoning any interest in ministry, he spent the next years doing odd jobs and studying law. He taught school in Portland for a year before moving to California in 1861. He was admitted to the bar in San Jose on September 8, 1863 after an examination by eminent California attorney William T. Wallace. However, he soon returned to Portland, deciding "nature never intended any man to live [in California], only to dig gold and get himself out of it, and to shudder in dreams ever afterwards."

On his return to Maine, Reed joined the law offices of Howard and Strout as a clerk. He joined the United States Navy in April 1864, winning an appointment as acting assistant paymaster on the recommendation of Senator Fessenden. He served in that role, primarily on the gunboat USS Sibyl on the Mississippi and Tennessee rivers, until honorably discharged in late 1865. When a Reed supporter later pointed out his opponents boasted of their war records, he retorted, "Tell them I kept a grocery on a gunboat down in Louisiana in wartime."

State politics (1867–76)

Maine legislator (1867–70)
After the war, Reed returned to Portland and was admitted to the Maine bar in October 1865. He opened a practice in Portland, taking petty civil and criminal cases. In 1867, his colleague Nathan Webb secured Reed's nomination for the Maine House of Representatives; after some persuading, Reed agreed to run. In the heavily Republican city of Portland, he was easily elected; he was re-elected to a second term in 1868.

Reed, one of the youngest members of the Maine House at the time, served on the joint legislative committee on the judiciary and drafted a bills for a general law of incorporation and the abolition of capital punishment in the state; both failed. He distinguished himself for parliamentary skill in the 1869 U.S. Senate election between former Vice President Hannibal Hamlin and incumbent Senator Lot M. Morrill, whom Reed supported. In the Republican caucus to nominate a candidate, Reed moved to rule a blank ballot invalid, breaking a tie in favor of Morrill. (Hamlin was later elected by a vote of the whole legislature.) Despite his youth, by March 1869 the Portland Press considered Reed "the actual though not the nominal leader of [the House]."

In 1869, Reed was elected Senator for Cumberland County. He continued to serve on the joint committee on the judiciary and successfully led the fight to delay construction of the Portland and Rutland Railroad. He also paid homage to his former patron, Senator Fessenden, who died in 1869. Though Fessenden had become unpopular in the state owing to his vote against the impeachment of Andrew Johnson, Reed aggressively defended his legacy and wartime service. Reed later reflected that his greatest achievement as a state legislator was securing the re-organization of the Cumberland County courts in an effort to reduce the time necessary to bring cases to a final judgment.

Attorney General of Maine (1870–73)
In January 1870, the Republican caucus nominated Reed for Attorney General, and he was elected easily. As Attorney General, Reed significantly raised his profile. His first months in office were marked by the high-profile trial of a man charged with killing his wife's lover. Overcoming a "crime of passion" defense, Reed won a manslaughter verdict, though he had asked for a charge of murder. As a result, Reed advocated for the abolition of spousal privilege, which had excluded the only witness, the defendant's wife, from testifying. He also advocated separately as Attorney General for bail bond reform and an increase in the State's peremptory challenges in jury selection. Most of Reed's suggestions did eventually become law, but were not adopted immediately, which he attributed to the fact that prosecutors were barred by virtue of their office from advising the legislature.

He continued to oppose the railroad corporations, calling for an increase in the $5,000 cap on wrongful death claims and challenging the merger of the Portland and Kennebec with the Maine Central under a writ of quo warranto; his action was rendered moot when the legislature recognized the merger as valid. In 1894, Reed spoke out in favor of consolidation and declared the writ was a mistake, arguing that the merger had "resulted in better stations, better trains, better transportation facilities of every kind."

Reed served as Attorney General for the three years prescribed by tradition before leaving office in 1873. He returned to a more lucrative private practice and served for three years as Portland city solicitor, representing the city in personal injury suits and routine business.

House of Representatives

1876 election 
Reed was nominated for Congress from Maine's first district in 1876. Incumbent Representative John H. Burleigh had split from the state party organization, led by Senators James G. Blaine and Hannibal Hamlin, and Reed, a respected organization man, was chosen to oppose him. Reed's strength was in the city of Portland, while most of Burleigh's support was from York County. Reed narrowly carried the district convention on June 29. The conflict between Reed and Burleigh carried into the general election, with a Burleigh ticket in the campaign. Reed campaigned in favor of prohibition and was attacked for his association with Robert G. Ingersoll, known for his radical advocacy for agnosticism. Reed was forced to deny that he was an atheist, but the charge would be repeated in later campaigns. Ultimately, Reed narrowly won by fewer than 1,000 votes on September 9, with Burleigh receiving 177.

Early congressional service and rise 
Reed was relatively active in debate during his first term, speaking against Fernando Wood in support of funding for the United States diplomatic corps and delivering his most famous early speech against the federal restoration of the campus of William & Mary College, which was destroyed during the war. Arguing that the expenditure would set a precedent which would allow "every claim agent who loved the Lost Cause and a good many who did not" to raid the Treasury, Reed argued, "You were beaten and yet you want us to take the consequences. You come forward and insist that the victorious country shall pay for the damages inflicted upon it by its enemies."

The highlight of his first term was his appointment on May 20, 1878 to the committee to investigate charges of fraud in the 1876 presidential election. Reed used the politically sensitive role to advocate the Republican position, restoring the party's fortunes ahead of the 1880 election. Reed defended the legitimacy Hayes's victory in the state of Louisiana, in particular focusing on East Feliciana Parish, where he alleged that a violent crime wave, including murder, had been for the purpose of political intimidation, as they had ended suddenly on election day and the victims had been primarily Republicans. Reed also cross-examined William T. Pelton, Tilden's nephew and aide, regarding evidence Pelton had delivered bribes on behalf of his uncle's campaign. Pelton's testimony under Reed's questioning was so damaging that Tilden appeared before the committee himself to deny the accusations. The final Republican minority report suggested Pelton, a poor man, could not have made such bribes without Tilden's knowledge. While the report did not vindicate Hayes, it softened the political blow by demonstrating that electioneering and misconduct had not been one-sided and raised Reed's prominence beyond that of an ordinary House freshman. 

His seat was nevertheless threatened by the rise of the Greenback Party, which favored an inflationary monetary policy, in Maine and his vote against the Bland-Allison Act. In his 1878 re-election campaign, he came out vigorously against paper currency and was aided by appearances from James Garfield and Galusha Grow. His re-election was ultimately owed to the failure of the opposition to settle on a single candidate, and he won with a plurality. During the campaign, Reed developed a widely quoted aphorism against monetary expansion: "You won't have any more potatoes if you call them four thousand pecks than if you call them one thousand bushels."

In 1880, Reed joined the rest of Maine in supporting James G. Blaine's unsuccessful campaiagn for the Republican nomination. He was a delegate to the 1880 Republican National Convention. In the fall, he faced a united opposition following the fusion of the Greenback and Democratic ticket in Maine. Returns gave Reed a 109-vote lead, but his opponent alleged fraud and challenged his election in the House. The Republican majority declared Reed the victor.

Party leadership (1881–89)

Judiciary chair (1881–83)
After Reed's election to a third term, he was briefly considered to succeed Hannibal Hamlin in the United States Senate, but he publicly declined to be a candidate. He attributed his decision to the narrow Republican majority in the House and the possibility that his seat would flip.

By the time the 47th United States Congress met on December 5, 1881, the new President James A. Garfield had been assassinated and Chester A. Arthur had succeeded him. With few tested leaders in the House, the Republican caucus turned to J. Warren Keifer as Speaker of the House after sixteen ballots; Reed finished third  with eleven votes on the final ballot, behind Frank Hiscock. In a concession to his opponents, Keifer named Hiscock and Reed to House leadership as chairs of the powerful committees on Appropriations and the Judiciary, respectively. Reed also joined the Speaker and George Robeson on the powerful Committee on Rules after the January 9, 1882 resignation of Godlove Orth, another Keifer opponent who was left out of leadership.

As a member of House leadership and the Rules Committee, Reed defended the Speaker's authority to appoint committee chairs. When Orth introduced a resolution to select committees by an elective board of eleven members, Reed spoke out against it on the grounds that "the Speaker is not only under constant supervision of public opinion but also of the House." The resolution lost by a large nonpartisan majority.

In May, during debate over a contested election in North Carolina, the parties came to a head over the minority's use of the filibuster. In response, Reed introduced a motion to amend the House rules to bar any dilatory motion while a motion to adjourn was on the table. After a week of efforts by the Democratic minority to delay his rules amendment, Reed moved the dilatory tactics were out of order and proposed that "no member or set of members have any right to use the rules which are to be changed to prevent the change which the House desires to make. ... There is no such thing as suicide in any proision of the Constitution of the United States." After three hours of debate, Keifer upheld Reed on the point of order. Samuel J. Randall protested and appealed to the House, where the Speaker's decision was upheld by a majority vote. According to De Alva S. Alexander, "[From] that hour Reed became the real leader of his party. Ever after, so long as he remained in Congress, his voice gave the word of command."

Speaker of the House

Reed was first elected Speaker after an intense fight with William McKinley of Ohio. Reed gained the support of young Theodore Roosevelt; his influence as the newly appointed Civil Service Commissioner was the decisive factor. Reed served as the Speaker of the United States House of Representatives from 1889 to 1891 and then from 1895 to 1899, as well as being Chairman of the powerful Rules Committee.

Rules 
During his time as Speaker, Reed assiduously and dramatically increased the power of the Speaker over the House; although the power of the Speaker had always waxed (most notably during Henry Clay's tenure) and waned, the position had previously commanded influence rather than outright power. Reed set out to put into practical effect his dictum, "The best system is to have one party govern and the other party watch." That was accomplished by carefully studying the existing procedures of the US House, most dating to the original designs, written by Thomas Jefferson. In particular, Reed sought to circumscribe the ability of the minority party to block business by way of its members refusing to answer a quorum call, which, under the rules, prevented a member from being counted as present even if he were physically in the chamber, thus forcing the House to suspend business. That is popularly called the disappearing quorum.

Reed's solution was enacted on January 29, 1890, in what has popularly been called the "Battle of the Reed Rules".

That came about when Democrats attempted to block the inclusion of a newly elected Republican from West Virginia, Charles Brooks Smith, The motion to seat Brooks passed by a tally of 162–1; however, at the time, a quorum consisted of 165 votes, and when voting closed Democrats shouted, "No quorum," triggering a formal House quorum count. Reed began the roll call; when members who were present in the chamber refused to answer, Reed directed the Clerk to count them as present but not voting. Startled Democrats protested heatedly, directing verbal abuse, threats, and insults at Reed, while James B. McCreary, a Democrat from Kentucky, challenged Reed's authority to count him since he had not answered to his name when the roll was called. Reed replied "The Chair is making a statement of fact that the gentleman from Kentucky is present. Does he deny it?"

Unable to deny their presence in the chamber, Democrats then tried to flee the chamber or hide under their desks, but Reed ordered the doors locked. Only one Representative, Constantine B. Kilgore of Texas, was able to flee by kicking his way through a door.

The conflict over parliamentary procedure lasted three days, with Democrats delaying consideration of the bill by introducing points of order to challenge the maneuver and then appealing Reed's rulings to the floor. Democrats finally dropped their objections on January 31, and Smith was seated on February 3 by a vote of 166–0.

Six days later, with Smith seated, Reed won a vote on his new "Reed Rules," eliminating the disappearing quorum and lowering the quorum to 100 members. Though Democrats reinstated the disappearing quorum when they took control of the House the following year, Reed as minority leader proved so adroit at using the tactic against them that Democrats reinstated Reed Rules in 1894.

Civil rights 
In 1889 and 1890, Republicans undertook one last stand in favor of federal enforcement of the Fifteenth Amendment to protect the voting rights of blacks in the Solid South. Reed took a special interest in the project. Using his new rules vigorously, he won passage of the Lodge Bill in the House in 1890. The bill was later defeated in a filibuster in the Senate when Silver Republicans in the West traded it away for the Sherman Silver Purchase Act.

Reed sought the Republican nomination for President in 1896, but Mark Hanna secured the nomination for Ohio Governor William McKinley.

In 1898, Reed joined McKinley in efforts to head off war with Spain. When McKinley switched to supporting the war, Reed, refusing to change his position, opposed him and then resigned from both the speakership and his seat in Congress in 1899, returning to private law practice.

Personal life

He married Susan P. Merrill, born at Center Harbor, New Hampshire, on Lake Winnipesaukee. Her father, the Rev. Samuel H. Merrill, a well-known Congregational clergyman, was pastor of a church in Center Harbor at the time of her birth. Six years afterwards he returned with his family to his native state, Maine. During the Civil War, Merrill served as chaplain of the First Maine Cavalry, and Susan also had a brother in this famous regiment. Merrill's pastorates, aside from his war experiences, were principally in Maine. Susan Merrill's mother was Hannah Prentis, a native of New Hampshire. Merrill had one brother, Edward P. Merrill, and one sister, who resided in Lowell, Massachusetts. Merrill and Reed were friends in childhood, attending school together in Portland. They married in 1871. Reed was then a member of the Maine Legislature, and the young couple went immediately to Augusta, the state capital. They had one daughter, Katherine.

He was known for his acerbic wit (asked if his party might nominate him for President, he noted, "They could do worse, and they probably will"). His size, standing at over 6 feet in height and weighing over 300 lbs (136 kg), was also a distinguishing factor for him. Reed was a member of the social circle that included intellectuals and politicians Henry Cabot Lodge, Theodore Roosevelt, Henry Adams, John Hay and Mark Twain.

His daughter, Katherine Reed Balentine, started a monthly magazine in San Francisco called The Yellow Ribbon, which promoted women's suffrage.

Death and legacy
In early December 1902, Reed was in Washington on legal business with the United States Supreme Court. On December 2, Reed visited his former colleagues in the Ways and Means Committee room. Later that day, he became ill while in another room of the Capitol and was rushed to the nearby Arlington Hotel. In the Arlington, Reed was diagnosed with Bright's disease complicated by appendicitis; he died five days later at 12:10am on December 7 with his wife and daughter at his bedside. A Gridiron Club dinner was occurring at the same time in the same hotel as Reed's death. When news broke of Reed's passing, "the diners rose to drink a silent toast to a man who had so often been among them". 

In announcing his death to the House, Representative James S. Sherman said, "He was so great, his service to his country so valuable, that it seems we may fitly depart from what is the usual custom of the House when one not in public life dies." The House thus adopted a resolution honoring Reed as "a distinguished statesman, a lofty patriot, a cultured scholar, an incisive writer, a unique orator, an unmatched debated, a master of logic, wit, satire, the most famous of the world's parliamentarians, the great and representative citizen of the American Republic."

Henry Cabot Lodge eulogized him as "a good hater, who detested shams, humbugs and pretense above all else." Mark Twain wrote of him, "He was transparently honest and honorable, there was no furtiveness about him, and whoever came to know him trusted him and was not disappointed. He was wise, he was shrewd and alert, he was a clear and capable thinker, a logical reasoner, and a strong and convincing speaker."

He was buried in Evergreen Cemetery in Portland, Maine. His will was executed by his good friend, the financier Augustus G. Paine Sr. He left his family an estate of $200,000.

There is a Reed House at Bowdoin College.

His home town of Portland, Maine, erected a statue of him at the corner of Western Promenade and Pine Street in a ceremony on August 31, 1910. His last home in Portland has been designated a National Historic Landmark in his honor.

In 1894, he published his handbook on parliamentary procedure, titled Reed's Rules: A Manual of General Parliamentary Law, which was, at the time, a very popular text on the subject and is still in use in the legislature of the State of Washington.

Biographies of the life of Thomas Brackett Reed have been written by Samuel McCall (Houghton Mifflin Company, 1914), William A. Robinson (Dodd, Mead & Company, 1930), and Richard Stanley Offenberg (Ph.D. diss., New York University, 1963). Finance writer James Grant wrote the biography entitled, Mr. Speaker! The Life and Times of Thomas B. Reed: the Man who Broke the Filibuster. The most recent scholarly biography is Thomas Brackett Reed: The Gilded Age Speaker Who Made the Rules for American Politics by Robert J. Klotz (University Press of Kansas, 2022). One chapter of Barbara Tuchman's The Proud Tower is substantially devoted to Reed.

Notes

References

Bibliography

Biographies

Other books

Articles and journals

Primary sources

External links

 
 
 
 
 C-SPAN Q&A interview with James Grant about Mr. Speaker! The Life and Times of Thomas B. Reed, The Man Who Broke the Filibuster, June 5, 2011
 

 
 

 
 

1839 births
1902 deaths
19th-century American lawyers
19th-century American politicians
Bowdoin College alumni
Burials at Evergreen Cemetery (Portland, Maine)
Deans of the United States House of Representatives
Deaths from appendicitis
Deaths from kidney disease
Maine Attorneys General
Republican Party members of the Maine House of Representatives
Paymasters
Politicians from Portland, Maine
Portland High School (Maine) alumni
Republican Party members of the United States House of Representatives from Maine
Speakers of the United States House of Representatives